Farmer's Market is an album by trumpeter Art Farmer, featuring performances recorded in 1956 and released on the New Jazz label.

Reception

The Allmusic review stated: "Considering this is early period Farmer, and that his work after leaving the U.S. for Europe led him to playing the softer toned flugelhorn and trumpet exclusively, it is an important document in his legacy, comparing favorably alongside peers Clifford Brown, Miles Davis, and an also emerging Donald Byrd or Lee Morgan". The Penguin Guide to Jazz gave it three stars out of four, commenting positively on Drew's soloing, but stating that the album "suffers slightly from unexpectedly heavy tempos and an erratic performance from Mobley".

Track listing
All compositions by Kenny Drew except as indicated
 "With Prestige" – 5:13    
 "Ad-Dis-Un" – 6:22    
 "Farmer's Market" (Art Farmer) – 5:50    
 "Reminiscing" (Gigi Gryce) – 4:57    
 "By Myself" (Howard Dietz, Arthur Schwartz) – 7:03    
 "Wailin' with Hank" (Hank Mobley) – 7:13

Personnel
Art Farmer – trumpet
Hank Mobley – tenor saxophone (tracks 1–3 & 6)
Kenny Drew – piano
Addison Farmer – bass
Elvin Jones – drums

References 

New Jazz Records albums
Art Farmer albums
1958 albums
Albums recorded at Van Gelder Studio
Albums produced by Bob Weinstock